On July 19, 1805, an Italian shoemaker named Mattio Lovat crucified himself outside the third floor window of his Venice home. He was rescued by passersby, sent to the hospital, and recovered. Lovat had attempted to crucify himself once before in 1803, also in Venice, but was prevented from doing so by several bystanders. Lovat died in 1806 at a mental hospital on the island of San Servolo.

Background
Mattio Lovat was born in 1761 to a poor family in Casale, in the territory of Belluno, Italy. Lovat worked as a shoemaker, and in November 1802, he moved to Venice. His younger brother Angelo helped him find lodging at the house of a widow. He stayed there until the first of his two attempts at self-crucifixion.

Self-crucifixion attempt of 1803
In the middle of the street called Cross of Biri, Mattio made an attempt of self-crucifixion upon a frame that he had constructed using the timber of his bed. He was prevented from succeeding by several people who came upon him as he was driving a nail into his left foot. When interrogated about the motive for his self-crucifixion, he was silent. He once said to his brother that that day was the festival of St. Matthew and that he could give no further explanation. Days after the affair, he set out for his own country, where he remained for some time, but afterwards returned to Venice, and in July 1805, lodged in a room in the third floor of a house, in the street Delle Monache.

Self-crucifixion attempt of 1805
On July 19, 1805, Mattio attempted to crucify himself in a public street. He constructed a wooden cross, inflicted a wound on his side, and put a crown of thorns on his head. In order to re-enact the crucifixion of Jesus Christ, he then fixed himself to the cross with nails. Using a net that tied his body to the wooden beam, he finally hung himself and the cross out of the window of his room. With his left arm nailed to the cross, and his right hanging down, Lovat was found alive in the early morning by a passer-by who took him down from the cross and put him to bed.

Aftermath
Venetian physician Cesare Ruggieri came to see Lovat out of curiosity and made sure that he was immediately admitted to the Clinical School of Venice at which he himself was Professor of Surgery. For several weeks, Ruggieri treated and observed Lovat at his bedside until he had physically recovered. Due to Ruggieri's diagnosis of a persistent mental disorder, Lovat was then transferred to the asylum of San Servolo, an early mental asylum situated on an island of the same name in the Venetian lagoon, where Lovat died in April 1806 from an unspecified chest disease.

The case was closed. Soon after, Ruggieri wrote down the medical case history of his patient. In his case narrative, titled in Italian Storia della crocifissione di Mattio Lovat da se stesso eseguita, Ruggieri suggested that Lovat suffered from a kind of mental disorder that was connected to religion. Ruggieri subsequently published, between 1806 and 1814, the illustrated case report in two Italian versions and one in French. Subsequently, the narrative of Lovat's self-crucifixion was read, commented on, rewritten and reproduced by editors and authors in Italy, France, Germany and Britain throughout the nineteenth century. A book about Lovat's self-crucifixion, The Man Who Crucified Himself: Readings of a Medical Case in Nineteenth-Century Europe was published in November 2018.

The book, published in 1814, tells the story of his crucified patient.

A case report about Lovat's self-crucifixion is available.

References

July 1803 events
July 1805 events
1761 births
1806 deaths
1803 in Italy
1805 in Italy
Crucifixion
People from Venice
History of Venice after 1797